Kalanji, is a suburb located North of Chennai, a metropolitan city in Tamil Nadu, India.

Administration
It is a revenue village and a part of Kattupalli village panchayat in Minjur block. It is administered by Ponneri taluk of Tiruvallur district.

Location
Kalanji is located in between Ennore, Pazhaverkadu and Minjur in North of Chennai. The arterial road in Kalanji is Port access road (Ennore – Pazhaverkadu road).

References

Neighbourhoods in Chennai